Potapovsky is a rural locality (a khutor) in Kumylzhenskoye Rural Settlement, Kumylzhensky District, Volgograd Oblast, Russia. The population was 144 as of 2010. There are 4 streets.

Geography 
Potapovsky is located in forest steppe, on Khopyorsko-Buzulukskaya Plain, on the bank of the Sukhodol River, 15 km northeast of Kumylzhenskaya (the district's administrative centre) by road. Sigayevsky is the nearest rural locality.

References 

Rural localities in Kumylzhensky District